Frank Eric Jaenicke (23 August 1892 – 2 February 1951) was a Co-operative Commonwealth Federation member of the House of Commons of Canada. He was born in Germany and became a barrister by career.

Jaenicke was an unsuccessful 1938 provincial election candidate for the Saskatchewan Co-operative Commonwealth Federation in the constituency of Kerrobert-Kindersley.

He was first elected to Parliament from the Kindersley riding in the 1945 general election. Jaenicke was defeated in the 1949 election by Fred Larson of the Liberal party.

References

External links
 

1892 births
1951 deaths
German emigrants to Canada
Members of the House of Commons of Canada from Saskatchewan
Co-operative Commonwealth Federation MPs
20th-century Canadian politicians